Bhabanipur Assembly constituency is a Legislative Assembly constituency of Kolkata district in the Indian state of West Bengal.

Overview
As per orders of the Delimitation Commission, No. 159 Bhabanipur Assembly constituency is composed of the following: Ward Nos. 63, 70, 71, 72, 73, 74, 77 and 82 of Kolkata Municipal Corporation.

Bhabanipur Assembly constituency is part of No. 23 Kolkata Dakshin (Lok Sabha constituency).

Members of Legislative Assembly

Election results

2021 By-Election

2021

2016

Bye-election, 2011
The bypoll to the Bhowanipore seat was necessitated after sitting MLA of Trinamool Congress Subrata Bakshi resigned to make way for the Chief Minister Mamata Banerjee to contest. She had not contested the state assembly elections earlier. She had to become a member of the state assembly within six months of her assuming office as Chief Minister as per the rules of the Constitution of India.

2011

References

Assembly constituencies of West Bengal
Politics of Kolkata district